Austin Hall (1885 – 1933) was an American short story writer and novelist.  He began writing when, while working as a cowboy, he was asked to write a story.  He wrote westerns, science fiction and fantasy for pulp magazines.

Works 
(from the Internet Speculative Fiction Database)

Novels

 The Blind Spot (1921), with Homer Eon Flint
 People of the Comet (1923)
 The Spot of Life (1932)

Serials

 Into the Infinite (1919)

Short fiction

 "Almost Immortal" (1916)
 "The Rebel Soul" (1917)
 "The Man Who Saved the Earth" (1919)

References

Sources

External links

 
 
 
 

1880s births
1933 deaths
20th-century American novelists
American fantasy writers
American male novelists
American science fiction writers
American male short story writers
20th-century American short story writers
20th-century American male writers